Masoud Khosravinejad (born March 25, 1980 in Tehran) was an Iranian judoka who competed in the men's half-heavyweight category. He finished fifth in the 90-kg division at the 2002 Asian Games in Busan, South Korea, and later represented his nation Iran at the 2004 Summer Olympics.

Khosravinejad has been selected to the Iranian squad in the men's half-heavyweight class (100 kg) at the 2004 Summer Olympics in Athens, based on the nation's entry to the top 22 for his own division in the world rankings by the International Judo Federation. He conceded three shido penalties and succumbed to a waza-ari hold from Russia's Dmitry Maksimov during their opening match.

References

External links

1980 births
Living people
Iranian male judoka
Olympic judoka of Iran
Judoka at the 2004 Summer Olympics
Judoka at the 2002 Asian Games
Sportspeople from Tehran
Asian Games competitors for Iran
21st-century Iranian people